"Two Hearts" is a song by Phil Collins from the soundtrack to the film Buster (1988). The song was written and produced by Collins and Lamont Dozier. It reached number one in the United States and Canada in January 1989.

Released on 7 November 1988, "Two Hearts" charted in 19 countries, and topped the charts of the US, Canada, and Japan. The song topped the US Billboard Hot 100 for two weeks, the US Billboard Adult Contemporary chart for five weeks, and also reached number six on the UK Singles Chart.

"Two Hearts" won the Golden Globe Award for Best Original Song and the Grammy Award for Best Song Written Specifically for a Motion Picture or Television in 1989.

Background
"Two Hearts" was composed by Lamont Dozier of Motown's Holland-Dozier-Holland (who also co-composed the music for the Supremes hit "You Can't Hurry Love", which Collins covered six years earlier), with lyrics by Collins, both of whom also produced this song for the crime comedy film Buster (1988). Both singles for the film, "Two Hearts" and "A Groovy Kind of Love", topped the US charts.

The song was used to open the radio station BBC Hereford and Worcester, which broadcasts from two different counties.

Track listings
7" single
 "Two Hearts" – 3:24
 "The Robbery" -  London Film Orchestra, conducted by Anne Dudley (edit) – 3:18

12" maxi
 "Two Hearts" – 3:23
 "The Robbery" -  London Film Orchestra, conducted by Anne Dudley (full length) – 7:20

Music video
Two music videos were made, both directed by Jim Yukich and produced by Paul Flattery. The first one was similar to Collins' 1982 video "You Can't Hurry Love" featuring Collins as all four members in a band (named "The Four Pound Notes") and a cameo appearance by British DJ Tony Blackburn. The other featured him in a wrestling match against the Ultimate Warrior, which was featured on the Jim Yukich-directed, Paul Flattery-produced Seriously.. Phil Collins CBS TV special (aired 8 September 1990). The special can be found on the 2004 First Final Farewell Tour DVD.

Chart performance

Weekly charts

Year-end charts

Personnel
Phil Collins - vocals, keyboards, drums
Freddie Washington - bass
Michael Landau - electric guitar
Paulinho da Costa - tambourine

See also
List of Hot 100 number-one singles of 1989 (U.S.)
List of number-one adult contemporary singles of 1988 (U.S.)

References

External links
 

1988 singles
Phil Collins songs
Best Original Song Golden Globe winning songs
Grammy Award for Best Song Written for Visual Media
Billboard Hot 100 number-one singles
Cashbox number-one singles
Number-one singles in Denmark
Number-one singles in Japan
Songs written by Phil Collins
Songs written by Lamont Dozier
RPM Top Singles number-one singles
Song recordings produced by Phil Collins
1988 songs
Song recordings produced by Lamont Dozier
Atlantic Records singles
Virgin Records singles
Warner Music Group singles